Ian James Norman is a British nursing researcher and author, based in Surrey, UK. His research and writing is focused primarily in the fields of psychiatric and mental health nursing, and psychological treatments for people with mental health difficulties. Norman is Emeritus Professor of Mental Health in the Faculty of Nursing, Midwifery & Palliative Care at King's College London. He is a former Executive Dean of Faculty and Assistant Principal 
(Academic Performance) at King's. He is the Editor-in-Chief of the International Journal of Nursing Studies and a practising cognitive behavioural psychotherapist.

Biography
Ian Norman was born in Devon and attended Exeter School. He holds a BA degree in the social sciences from the University of Keele, an MSc degree in education from Edinburgh University and a PhD degree from London University. He was appointed as a Lecturer in Psychiatric Nursing in the Department of Nursing Studies, King’s College London, in 1988, was promoted to Senior Lecturer in 1994 and to Professor of Mental Health in 1997. He was appointed Editor-in-Chief of the International Journal of Nursing Studies in 2005.

Norman was a Visiting Professor at the University of São Paulo in 2011 and had periods of secondment to South Africa in 2014 and Ireland in 2015 to work on an EU-funded study  to reduce the risk of codeine misuse and dependence.

In August 2018 Norman was interviewed on a live breakfast-time TV channel about a nursing education initiative between King's College London and Ngee Ann Academy Singapore and the world shortage of healthcare workers.

Norman is the author of more than 300 academic outputs. His latest book, The Art & Science of Mental Health Nursing (published in its 4th edition in 2018), is a standard textbook for mental health nurse education in the UK and is well known internationally.

Awards and honours
2015: Fellow, King's College London
2015: Eileen Skellern Memorial Lecture http:
2012: International Fellow, American Academy of Nursing 
2009: Fellow,  Royal College of Nursing   
2005: Fellow, UK Higher Education Academy
2004: Fellow, European Academy of Nursing Science

Publications

Books

Norman IJ, Ryrie I (eds) 1st edition (2004); 2nd edition (2009); 3rd edition (2013), 4th edition (2018) The art and science of mental health nursing: a textbook of principles and practice. Open University Press, London.

Norman IJ, Cowley S (eds) (1999) The changing nature of nursing in a managerial age. Blackwells, London.

Norman IJ, Redfern SJ (eds) (1997) Mental health care for elderly people. Churchill Livingstone, Edinburgh.

Kogan M, Redfern SJ, Kober A, Norman IJ, Packwood T, Robinson S (1995) Making use of clinical audit: a guide to practice in the health professions. Open University Press, London.

Memberships, licences, and associations

Registered Nurse, Nursing & Midwifery Council, UK (1976–present)
British Association of Behavioural and Cognitive Psychotherapists (2009–present) 
Member, Health Technology Panel for Mental Health, Psychology and Occupational Therapy National Institute for Health and Care Research, UK (2015-2018)

References

External links 
https://kclpure.kcl.ac.uk/portal/en/persons/ian-norman(72d3cce4-ac65-4c52-85cc-9abc061406ae).html
http://www.skellern.info/page19.html
https://dorkingcbt.co.uk

Academics of King's College London
English nurses
Nursing researchers
British psychologists
Psychiatric nurses
Living people
Fellows of the Royal College of Nursing
People educated at Exeter School
Alumni of Keele University
Alumni of the University of Edinburgh
Alumni of the University of London
Fellows of the American Academy of Nursing
1952 births
Fellows of King's College London
British nurses